is a Japanese footballer currently playing as a forward for Nagano Parceiro.

Career statistics

Club
.

Notes

References

External links

2001 births
Living people
People from Nagano (city)
Association football people from Nagano Prefecture
Japanese footballers
Association football forwards
J3 League players
AC Nagano Parceiro players